Small Fry was a compilation album of phonograph records by Bing Crosby  released in 1941 featuring songs centered on the main song, "Small Fry", which was sung by Bing Crosby in the 1938 film Sing You Sinners.

Track listing
These previously issued songs were featured on a 5-disc, 78 rpm album set, Decca Album No. 202.

References

1941 compilation albums
Bing Crosby compilation albums
Decca Records compilation albums